Axel Hedenlund, Jr. (February 11, 1888 – April 18, 1919) was a Swedish track and field athlete who competed in the 1908 Summer Olympics. In 1908 he finished eighth in the high jump competition.

References

External links
profile

1888 births
1919 deaths
Swedish male high jumpers
Olympic athletes of Sweden
Athletes (track and field) at the 1908 Summer Olympics
Olympic male high jumpers